Peniker Gilliard (May 13, 1904 – May 22, 1981) was an American Negro league outfielder in the 1930s.

A native of Mansfield, Louisiana, Gilliard made his Negro leagues debut in 1937 with the Memphis Red Sox. He finished his career the following season with the Chicago American Giants and Kansas City Monarchs. Gilliard died in Los Angeles, California in 1981 at age 77.

References

External links
 and Baseball-Reference Black Baseball Stats and Seamheads

1904 births
1981 deaths
Chicago American Giants players
Kansas City Monarchs players
Memphis Red Sox players
Baseball outfielders
Baseball players from Louisiana
People from Mansfield, Louisiana
20th-century African-American sportspeople